Caurel is a commune in the Côtes-d'Armor department of Brittany in northwestern France.

Geography

The village is located on the north shore of the Lake Guerlédan.

Climate
Caurel has a oceanic climate (Köppen climate classification Cfb).

Map

Population

Inhabitants of Caurel are called Caurelois in French and Kaoreliz in Breton.

See also
Communes of the Côtes-d'Armor department

References

External links

Communes of Côtes-d'Armor